Kowsar is a medium-range, land-based anti-ship missile made by Iran. It can defeat electronic jamming systems and "cannot be thrown off course", according to Iranian officials.

The Kowsar designation apparently (Missile Defense Advocacy Alliance 2006) is used to refer to two different missiles: Iranian-produced versions of the PRC C-701 and the TL-10A.

Combat history
Some news reports indicate that this was the missile used on July 14, 2006 in the 2006 Lebanon War when Hezbollah fired two at Israeli warships.
One of the missiles hit the corvette INS Hanit, causing heavy damage and the deaths of four Israeli servicemen.  The other missile hit an Egyptian merchant ship causing heavy damage; it is reported that all the crew survived.

See also 
Military of Iran
Iranian military industry
Equipment of the Iranian Army

References 

Missile Defense Advocacy Alliance - "Iran acquires additional Chinese missile technology." Aviation Week & Space Technology. April 10, 2006.
Picture

Anti-ship missiles of Iran
Surface-to-surface missiles of Iran
Guided missiles of Iran
Military equipment introduced in the 2000s